Barbus peloponnesius is a ray-finned fish species in the family Cyprinidae. The western Balkan barbel (B. rebeli) is sometimes included in the present species.

It is found only in Greece and Bulgaria. Its natural habitats are rivers and freshwater lakes. It is not considered a threatened species by the IUCN, however a subspecies, Barbus peloponnesius petenyi, is protected and considered threatened. The latter can be found in the Danube basin, particularly in areas of the Duna-Ipoly National Park in Hungary.

References

P
Freshwater fish of Europe
Fish described in 1842
Taxonomy articles created by Polbot